Aragua Fútbol Club is a Venezuelan football team based in the city of Maracay, in the state of Aragua. The club began its professional career playing in the Venezuelan Segunda División a year after the club was founded. Since 2005, Aragua plays in the Primera División Venezolana.

The club's colors are yellow and red, although they were blue and white in the club's beginnings. Home games are played at the Olímpico Hermanos Ghersi in Maracay, with a 16,000 spectator capacity.

Aragua won the 2005–06 Venezuelan Segunda División and the 2007 Copa Venezuela.

History
For the 2002–03 season, Deportivo Galicia moves to the Estadio Olímpico Hermanos Ghersi and was born a new franchise named Aragua Fútbol Club. The team continues to play in the Venezuelan Segunda División until the 2004–05 season, when they achieve promotion to the Venezuelan Primera División.

Aragua FC make their debut in the Venezuelan Primera División with a goalless tie against Trujillanos on 5 August 2005, and remaining unbeaten during the first five games of the season. Rafael Mea Vitali scored Aragua's first goal in the top flight. Aragua FC end up finishing the 2005–06 season in 7th place.

At the start of the 2006–07 season, goalkeeper Renny Vega is called up by national team coach Richard Páez to represent the Venezuela national football team in a match against Colombia, making Vega the first player to receive an international call-up while playing for Aragua FC.

In 2008, led by manager Manolo Contreras, Aragua won the Copa Venezuela and automatically qualified to participate in the 2008 edition of the Copa Sudamericana, where they were eliminated in the first round by Guadalajara. At the end of the 2007–08 season, José Salomón Rondón was awarded as Youth of the Year, marking the first time that an Aragua FC player received the distinction.

Titles
Venezuelan Segunda División: 1
2005

Copa Venezuela: 1
2007

Performance in CONMEBOL competitions

Copa Sudamericana: 1 appearance
2008: First Round

Club culture

Supporters
The Aragua FC fans are known as Los Vikingos (The Vikings), and they traditionally occupy the western stand of the stadium, known as La Popular (The Popular). They are made up of several factions that represent different cities across the state: Artillería Aurirroja (Yellow and Red Artillery), Cagua Aurirroja, Caña de Azúcar, El Limón, Turmero Aurirrojo, Santa Rita, and Santa Rosa Aurirroja. As is the case with supporter groups of other Venezuelan teams, the factions only exist in theory, and in practice all the supporters act as a unified body.

Rivalries

The club's main rival is Carabobo FC, from the neighboring state of Carabobo. The fixture is popularly known as El Clásico de la Autopista (The Highway Classic). Due to the proximity of both states' capitals, Aragua-Carabobo rivalries exist in virtually every professional sport practiced in Venezuela. In 18 encounters, Aragua has achieved 6 victories against Carabobo's 4. The classic is currently "on hold" since Carabobo was relegated to the Venezuelan Segunda División after the 2011–12 season.

Managers

 Carlos Maria Ravel (2002–04)
 Rafael Santana Fontes (2004–06)
 Rafael Santana Segovia (2006–07)
 Eduardo Contreras (2007)
 Manolo Contreras (2008–10)
 Ángel Raúl Cavalleri (2010–13)
 Carlos Maldonado (2013)
 Ángel Raúl Cavalleri (2013–14)
 César Modesto González (2014)
 Manuel Plascencia (2014–)

References

External links
 Official site

Association football clubs established in 2002
Football clubs in Venezuela
Sport in Aragua
2002 establishments in Venezuela